The seventh season of Charmed, an American supernatural drama television series created by Constance M. Burge, premiered in the United States on The WB from September 12, 2004 through May 22, 2005. Airing on Sundays at 8:00 pm. Paramount Home Entertainment released the complete seventh season in a six-disc box set on February 2, 2007.

Cast and characters

Main 
 Alyssa Milano as Phoebe Halliwell
 Rose McGowan as Paige Matthews
 Holly Marie Combs as Piper Halliwell
 Brian Krause as Leo Wyatt
 Dorian Gregory as Darryl Morris

Recurring 
 Jennifer Rhodes as Penny Halliwell 
 James Read as Victor Bennett
 Rebecca Balding as Elise Rothman
 Sandra Prosper as Sheila Morris
 Jenya Lano as Inspector Sheridan
 Nick Lachey as Leslie St. Clair
 Elizabeth Dennehy as Sandra
 John de Lancie as Odin
 Charisma Carpenter as Kyra
 Kerr Smith as Kyle Brody
 Joel Swetow as Alpha
 Patrice Fisher as Beta
 Ian Anthony Dale as Gamma 
 Oded Fehr as Zankou
 Max Perlich as Laygan
 Billy Zane as Drake dè Mon

Guest 
 James Avery as Zola
 Billy Drago as Barbas, the Demon of Fear
 Finola Hughes as Patty Halliwell
 Harve Presnell as Captain Black Jack Cutting
 Simon Templeman as The Angel of Death
 T.J. Thyne as Danny
 Drew Fuller as Chris Halliwell
 Wes Ramsey as Wyatt Halliwell
 Bug Hall as Eddie Mullen
 Ann Cusack as Miss Donovan
 Chris Diamantopoulos as Davis
 Kevin Alejandro as Malvoc
 Corey Stoll as Demon
 Jon Hamm as Jack Brody
 Anne Dudek as Denise
 David Anders as Count Roget
 Julian McMahon as Cole Turner
 Don Swayze as Lucius
 Seamus Dever as Mitchell Haines
 John Kassir as Alchemist
 Keith Diamond as Reece Davidson
 Glenn Morshower as Agent Keyes
 Danneel Harris as Glamoured Paige Matthews
 Becki Newton as Glamoured Piper Halliwell
 Danielle Savre as Glamoured Phoebe

Special Musical Guest
The Donnas
Collective Soul

Episodes

Notes

References

External links 
List of Charmed season 7 episodes at the Internet Movie Database
 

Charmed (TV series)
Charmed (TV series) episodes
2004 American television seasons
2005 American television seasons